Perry County is a county located in the U.S. state of Arkansas. Its population was 10,019 at the 2020 United States Census. The county seat is Perryville. The county was formed on December 18, 1840, and named for Commodore Oliver Hazard Perry, naval hero in the War of 1812. It is an alcohol prohibition or dry county.

Perry County is included in the Little Rock–North Little Rock–Conway, AR Metropolitan Statistical Area.

Geography
It is the fourth-smallest county in Arkansas by land area and third-smallest by total area.

Major highways
 Highway 7
 Highway 9
 Highway 10
 Highway 60
 Highway 113
 Highway 300

Adjacent counties
Conway County (north)
Faulkner County (northeast)
Pulaski County (east)
Saline County (southeast)
Garland County (southwest)
Yell County (west)

National protected area
 Ouachita National Forest (part)

Demographics

2020 census

As of the 2020 United States census, there were 10,019 people, 3,668 households, and 2,824 families residing in the county.

2000 census
As of the 2000 census, there were 10,209 people, 3,989 households, and 2,939 families residing in the county.  The population density was 18 people per square mile (7/km2).  There were 4,702 housing units at an average density of 8 per square mile (3/km2).  The racial makeup of the county was 95.62% White, 1.73% Black or African American, 0.98% Native American, 0.15% Asian, 0.02% Pacific Islander, 0.39% from other races, and 1.11% from two or more races.  1.18% of the population were Hispanic or Latino of any race.

There were 3,989 households, out of which 32.60% had children under the age of 18 living with them, 61.10% were married couples living together, 8.70% had a female householder with no husband present, and 26.30% were non-families. 23.20% of all households were made up of individuals, and 10.40% had someone living alone who was 65 years of age or older.  The average household size was 2.52 and the average family size was 2.96.

In the county, the population was spread out, with 25.30% under the age of 18, 7.40% from 18 to 24, 28.00% from 25 to 44, 24.50% from 45 to 64, and 14.80% who were 65 years of age or older.  The median age was 38 years. For every 100 females, there were 98.30 males.  For every 100 females age 18 and over, there were 96.20 males.

The median income for a household in the county was $31,083, and the median income for a family was $37,170. Males had a median income of $28,254 versus $21,462 for females. The per capita income for the county was $16,216.  About 10.50% of families and 14.00% of the population were below the poverty line, including 17.00% of those under age 18 and 15.00% of those age 65 or over.

Government
Over the past few election cycles Perry County has trended heavily towards the GOP. The last Democrat (as of 2020) to carry this county was Bill Clinton in 1996.

Tourism
Perry County is known for its Fourche River Days Festival held each year in April which includes a Car, Truck, & Motorcycle show, Live music, Vendors 
and children's activities. 
Perry County is also known for its annual Goat Festival held in the Fall drawing thousands of tourists from around the country.
Perry County is also the location of Heifer Ranch, an arm of Heifer International, a nonprofit which provides food and agricultural training for people all across the globe.

Communities

Cities
Adona
Perryville (county seat)

Towns
Bigelow
Casa
Fourche
Houston
Perry

Census-designated places
 Aplin

Other unincorporated communities
 Ava
 Cherry Hill
 Fourche Junction
 Hollis
 Nimrod
 Toad Suck

Townships

 Aplin
 Casa (Casa)
 Cherry Hill
 Fourche Lafavre (most of Perryville)
 Houston (Houston)
 Kenney
 Lake (Perry)
 Maumelle
 New Tennessee
 Perry (Bigelow, Fourche)
 Petit Jean (Adona)
 Rankin
 Rose Creek
 Tyler
 Union
 Union Valley (small part of Perryville)
 Wye

Notable people
Mary Elizabeth Bentley (born 1961), Republican member of the Arkansas House of Representatives since 2015
Len E. Blaylock (1918-2012), Republican politician from Nimrod in Perry County
Bob Dorough (1923-2018), American bebop and jazz pianist most recognizable from Schoolhouse Rock! fame.

See also
 List of lakes in Perry County, Arkansas
 National Register of Historic Places listings in Perry County, Arkansas

References

External links
 Perry County, Arkansas entry on the Encyclopedia of Arkansas History & Culture

 
1840 establishments in Arkansas
Populated places established in 1840
Little Rock–North Little Rock–Conway metropolitan area